Daniel Allen Clark (born October 14, 1985) is an US-born Canadian actor. Clark is best known for his role as Sean Cameron on the CTV series Degrassi: The Next Generation and as Steve Rendazo in the 2007 film Juno.

Personal life
Clark was born in Chicago, Illinois. He has a younger brother Robert Clark, who starred in The Zack Files and Strange Days at Blake Holsey High. Clark was raised in Toronto, Ontario.

Career and education
At age 12, his first role was Chip in a stage production of Disney's Beauty and the Beast in 1997.

He made a number of appearances on TV series, including Eerie Indiana: The Other Dimension, Goosebumps and Are You Afraid of the Dark?, and featured roles in films such as Grizzly Falls and Model Behavior.

In 2001, Clark took a regular role as Sean Cameron on Degrassi: The Next Generation from season 1 until season 4. He took a hiatus from Degrassi in mid-season 4, in the episode "Back In Black", and was absent until his return as a regular in season 6 in 2006. He once again left the show at the end of season 6, but returned in a final guest appearance in season 7. In 2007, he appeared as Steve Rendazo in the film Juno. He also starred in a Hallmark film opposite Amber Tamblyn called The Russell Girl. He also appeared on an episode of NBC's ER, titled "Blame it on the Rain".

With other actors from the series, Clark is the winner of the 2002 Young Artist Award for "Best Ensemble Actor", having been nominated again in 2003 and 2006. He was nominated in 2000 for "Best Performance in a TV Comedy Series" as "Supporting Young Actor" for his part in I Was a Sixth Grade Alien.

He is one of the two actors on the Canadian production Degrassi: The Next Generation to have been born in the U.S., the other being Mazin Elsadig, who was also born in Illinois.

In 2012, he graduated from New York University. He majored in political science with a minor in business through the Stern School of Business.

Filmography
 (1998): Eerie, Indiana: The Other Dimension as Stanley Hope 
 (1998): Goosebumps as Mark Rowe 
 (1999): Grizzly Falls as Young Harry 
 (1999): I Was a Sixth Grade Alien  as Tim Thomkins / Tim Tomkins 
 (1999): Real Kids, Real Adventures as Sean Redden 
 (1999): Are You Afraid of the Dark? as Max 
 (2000): The Royal Diaries: Elizabeth I - Red Rose of the House of Tudor as Robin Dudley
 (2000): Model Behavior as Josh Burroughs
 (2000): Dear America: The Secret Diary of Princess Elizabeth as Robin Dudley
 (2000): Deep in the City as Gavin Mackie / Tres 
 (2001): The Zack Files as Mack Greenburg 
 (2001-2004, 2006-2007, 2008): Degrassi: The Next Generation as Sean Cameron
 (2002): Fizzy Bizness as Max 
 (2002): Earth: Final Conflict as Yulyn 
 (2005): ER as Jason Digby 
 (2005): Darcy's Wild Life as Aaron Shaw 
 (2007): Left for Dead as Brady 
 (2007): Juno as Steve Rendazo
 (2008): The Russell Girl as Daniel Russell

References

External links

MeeVee TV Interview

1985 births
21st-century Canadian male actors
American emigrants to Canada
American expatriates in Canada
Canadian male television actors
Living people
Male actors from Chicago
Male actors from Toronto
New York University alumni